Nursery Glacier is a glacier about 20 nautical miles (37 km) long, flowing southeast along the west side of Darley Hills to enter Ross Ice Shelf just south of Cape Parr. So named by the New Zealand Geological Survey Antarctic Expedition (NZGSAE) (1959–60) because it was on this glacier that a litter of husky pups was born.

Glaciers of Shackleton Coast